Branka Petrić (born 17 April 1937) is a Serbian actress. She appeared in more than seventy films since 1960. She was married to Kosovo-Albanian actor Bekim Fehmiu and has two sons with him.

Selected filmography

References

External links 

1937 births
Living people
Serbian film actresses
People from Novi Vinodolski
Serbs of Croatia